
Gmina Radoszyce is an urban-rural gmina (administrative district) in Końskie County, Świętokrzyskie Voivodeship, in south-central Poland.

Villages
Gmina Radoszyce contains the villages and settlements of Filipy, Górniki, Grębosze, Grodzisko, Gruszka, Huta, Jacentów, Jakimowice, Jarząb, Jóźwików, Kaliga, Kapałów, Kłucko, Lewoszów, Łysów, Momocicha, Mościska Duże, Mościska Małe, Mularzów, Nadworów, Nalewajków, Pakuły, Plenna, Podlesie, Radoska, Radoszyce, Salachowy Bór, Sęp, Szóstaki, Węgrzyn, Wilczkowice, Wiosna, Wisy, Wyrębów and Zychy.

Neighbouring gminas
Gmina Radoszyce is bordered by the gminas of Końskie, Łopuszno, Mniów, Ruda Maleniecka, Słupia and Smyków.

References
Polish official population figures 2006

Radoszyce
Końskie County